
Year 94 BC was a year of the pre-Julian Roman calendar. At the time it was known as the Year of the Consulship of Caldus and Ahenobarbus (or, less frequently, year 660 Ab urbe condita) and the Third Year of Taishi.

Events 
 By place 

 Anatolia 
 Approximate date – Nicomedes IV succeeds his father Nicomedes III as king of Bithynia.

 India 
 The Shakas start to control northwest India.

 Roman Republic 
 Consuls: Gaius Coelius Caldus and Lucius Domitius Ahenobarbus.
 The first (failed) attempt to open a Latin rhetorical school.
 Lucius Cornelius Sulla is elected praetor urbanus.

Births 
 Zhao of Han, Chinese emperor (d. 74 BC)

Deaths

References